Donna Barr (born August 13, 1952) is an American comic book author and cartoonist. She is best known for The Desert Peach and Stinz.

Life and education 
Donna Barr was born in Everett, Washington, and is the second child of six. She had earned a bachelor's degree in German from Ohio State University in 1978.  Barr had enlisted in the United States Army and served from 1970 to 1973.  She was a school trained teletype operator who was an E5, or Sergeant.  Because of this position she was not sent into war. Donna Barr had met her husband Dan during her time in the army.  She now lives in Clallam Bay, Washington with her husband.

Works 
She works in pencil, ink, watercolor, and silkscreen. 

She is known for her series Stinz and The Desert Peach.  Stinz, originally published in 1986 as a short story in a hand-bound book, tells the story of a society of centaur-like people in a setting reminiscent of pre-industrial Germany. The story was then serialized in the Eclipse Comics series The Dreamery, edited by Lex Nakashima, and was picked up by Albedo creator Steve Gallacci under his Thoughts & Images label, moving on to MU Press and its imprint Aeon Press. It was then self-published under A Fine Line Press.

Her other long-running series, The Desert Peach is about Pfirsich Rommel, the fictional homosexual younger brother of Erwin "The Desert Fox" Rommel. Beginning in 1987, it was set in North Africa during World War 2. The comic has been describes as a fantasy war comic that was set within the German regime.  Pfirsch (peach) Rommel is a colonel in the German Afrika Korps in World War II. The rest of this unit of misfits includes a mute radio officer, a shell-shocked mental case with a pet landmine, a French-speaking black Moroccan, an American prisoner of war, and a Cossack mercenary. In this context, a gay colonel engaged to marry a hotshot Luftwaffe ace does not seem out of place. It comes to fruition to long time readers that the story is actually a long running flashback. According to Barr, some of the themes within The Desert Peach are; "Love, Honor, Death and Tea, Surfing, fascism, obnoxious pilots and boyfriends, birth, love, hate, revenge, rape, child-murder, slavery, tribal customs, insanity, drug-use, prejudice, racism, death-camps, warfare, love-at-first-sight, homophobia, bad relationships, feminism, horse-training, camel-theft, fashion, marriage, euthanasia, grandchildren — etc., etc., etc". Donna Barr explains her process of creating The Desert Peach as, "I usually do a rough on scrap paper (junk mail has lots of blank backs!), happily cutting and pasting, then I copy the whole thing (so the back is clear), rearrange the copy backwards on the back of the final paper, slap in some lettering guides, flip it over on a light table, and use it as a rough guide while I ink. No penciling, and no erasing". The first three issues were published by Thoughts & Images. Additional issues were published by Fantagraphics Books, Aeon Press, and then self-published. The entirety of The Desert Peach series can be found on Webtoons. A Desert Peach musical was produced in 1992 and a novel was published in 2005.

Both Stinz and The Desert Peach are now largely serialized online and her novels are self-published. Other works include Hader and the Colonel (1987), The Barr Girls (1990), and Bosom Enemies (1987). Barr has also published a number of novels, including Permanent Party, An Insupportable Light, Ringcat and Bread and Swans. The last two of these feature Stinz and The Desert Peach, respectively. Barr has illustrated several GURPS roleplaying books, including GURPS Ice Age and GURPS Callahan's Crosstime Saloon,. and Traveller role-playing books, including Alien Module 8: Darrians, the MegaTraveller Player's Manual and several issues of both the Journal of the Travellers Aid Society and Challenge magazine. Her latest series, Afterdead, is a crossover of all of her characters. It is said to be politically charged and wild.

Her work has been translated into German, Japanese, Italian, and Croatian.  Barr has created a series of handmade ornate, stitchery-covered bound sketchbooks, called the Black Manuscripts.

Awards and accomplishments 
Barr has been recognized throughout her career with numerous awards and honors.  These include The Xeric Grant in 2000, The Bruce Brown Foundation Grant in 2004, San Diego Comicon International's  Inkpot Award in 1996, Seattle's Cartoonists Northwest's Toonies in 1998, London Comic Creator's Guild's Best Ongoing Humor Series in 1992, the Washington Press Association's  Communicator of Excellence for Fiction in 1997 and 1998. Barr appeared at the Cartoonists Northwest Association 2016 event and received a Golden Toonie Award.

Involvement 
Donna Barr has been involved in the Northwest community as a member of the Graphic Artists Guild, the National Writers Union, UAW/AFL/CIO, and has acted as a consultant for the Media curriculum in the Arts Department at Olympic College in Bremerton, Washington.  She lectures on her work at conventions and symposiums all over the United States, Canada, and Europe. She had attended Opttaconn in 2019.

References

External links 

 
 AfterDead
 Interview at Rational Magic
 Interview at WashingtonRuralHeritage.org
 Toonopedia The Desert Peach
 Webtoons The Desert Peach

1952 births
American female comics artists
Female comics writers
Living people
Role-playing game artists
Inkpot Award winners